The 1945 Boston Red Sox season was the 45th season in the franchise's Major League Baseball history. The Red Sox finished seventh in the American League (AL) with a record of 71 wins and 83 losses,  games behind the Detroit Tigers, who went on to win the 1945 World Series.

Offseason 
 Prior to 1945 season: Tom Poholsky was signed as an amateur free agent by the Red Sox.

Regular season 
 April 1945: At the urging of Boston City Councillor Isadore H. Y. Muchnick and with the active involvement of noted African American journalist Wendell Smith, General Manager Eddie Collins allowed three players from the Negro leagues to try out for the Red Sox. The players included Sam Jethroe from the Cleveland Buckeyes, Marvin Williams from the Philadelphia Stars, and Jackie Robinson from the Kansas City Monarchs.
 August 14, 1945: Handicapped Washington Senators coach Bert Shepard pitched in a game against the Red Sox. Shepard, who had an artificial leg, managed to give up only one run in five innings to the Red Sox.

Season standings

Record vs. opponents

Opening Day lineup

Roster

Player stats

Batting

Starters by position 
Note: Pos = Position; G = Games played; AB = At bats; H = Hits; Avg. = Batting average; HR = Home runs; RBI = Runs batted in

Other batters 
Note: G = Games played; AB = At bats; H = Hits; Avg. = Batting average; HR = Home runs; RBI = Runs batted in

Pitching

Starting pitchers 
Note: G = Games pitched; IP = Innings pitched; W = Wins; L = Losses; ERA = Earned run average; SO = Strikeouts

Other pitchers 
Note: G = Games pitched; IP = Innings pitched; W = Wins; L = Losses; ERA = Earned run average; SO = Strikeouts

Relief pitchers 
Note: G = Games pitched; W = Wins; L = Losses; SV = Saves; ERA = Earned run average; SO = Strikeouts

Farm system 

LEAGUE CHAMPIONS: Louisville

References

External links
1945 Boston Red Sox team page at Baseball Reference
1945 Boston Red Sox season at baseball-almanac.com

Boston Red Sox seasons
Boston Red Sox
Boston Red Sox
1940s in Boston